Rudolf "Ruedi" Noser (born 14 April 1961) is a Swiss businessman and politician. Between 2003 and 2015, he served as a member of the National Council (Switzerland) for The Liberals. In the 2015 Swiss federal election, Noser was elected into the Council of States and assumed office on 8 December 2015. He is the sole owner of Noser Group, a diversified software company, which he founded. Noser has an estimated net worth of CHF 50 million (equivalent to $55 million in 2023) estimated by Bilanz magazine.

Early life and education 
Noser was born 14 April 1961 in Glarus, Switzerland. His father Meinrad Noser (1921-1997) was a trained car mechanic. From 1978 to 1982, Noser completed an apprenticeship as a mechanic at Rieter in Winterthur. He then studied at the University of Applied Sciences Rapperswil and graduated in 1985 as an electrical engineer. Later he continued his education at the University of St. Gallen (HSG) in Business Management and at the University of Zurich in Business Administration.

Professional career 
Together with his brother, he set up a software company. In 1988, Ruedi Noser co-owned Noser AG (development of measurement and control technology) in Winterthur, which was restructured a year later to the Noser Group. Since 1996, he is the sole owner of the group. The Noser Group (Noser Management AG) includes several companies in Switzerland, Germany and Canada with a total of around 600 employees. The group competence lies in the area of telecommunications and computer science. Noser serves on the Board of Directors of Noser Management AG. From December 2006 to May 2008 he was chairman of the board of directors of Esmertec AG (now known as Myriad Group).

From 2000 to 2006, Noser was the Central President of Swiss Engineering. Since 2006 he is member of the board of ICTswitzerland and since 2009 president of the umbrella organization of the ICT industry. He is also a member of the Industrial Advisory Board of the Department of Computer Science of ETH Zurich and a member of the board of Economiesuisse and the Zurich Chamber of Commerce.

On 29 October 2018, Noser was elected to the Board of Directors of Crealogix Holding AG.

Politics 
From 1997 to 2004, Noser was board member of the FDP Canton Zurich, from 2000 to 2003 he was also vice president and from 2003 to 2004 president ad interim of the Cantonal party. He waived a candidacy for the presidium of the FDP Canton of Zurich. From 1999 to 2009 he was also a member of the executive board of the FDP Switzerland (now FDP.The Liberals) and from 2003 to 2009 vice-president of the national party.

In the 1999–2003 parliamentary term, Ruedi Noser sat on the canton council for the Zurich FDP and between 2003 and 2015 as a representative of the FDP Canton of Zurich in the National Council. On 22 November 2015, he was elected to the Council of States as a representative of the Canton of Zurich.

He became a co-founder and core member of the parliamentary group "ePower" in 2005.

Since 2011, Noser has been Vice President of the parliamentary group "Fiber Optic Network Switzerland" and since 2012, President of the Economic and Monetary Policy Working Group.

Personal life 
Noser is divorced and has five children. He is in a relationship and resides in Wetzikon near Zurich.

References

External links 
 
 Website from Ruedi Noser
 Website of the Noser Group
 Broadcast «Schawinski, Roger Schawinski in conversation with Ruedi Noser. 21 October 2013

Free Democratic Party of Switzerland politicians
FDP.The Liberals politicians
Swiss businesspeople
University of St. Gallen alumni
University of Zurich alumni
1961 births
Living people